Maria Boberg (1784-1839), was a Swedish businessperson.

She was a fruit merchant in Stockholm. In 1802, she applied to the city authorities for a permit to trade as a månglare. The månglare-permit was granted by the city authorities to people (foremost married women) who could argue that they needed to support themselwes, and there where regulations to prevent a månglare from expanding their business beyond what was needed for self support. Maria Boberg belonged to the minority of månglare who managed to become wealthy on her business. It was uncommon for a månglare to achieve her level of success. A sign of this was the fact that Maria Boberg was not addressed with the title månglare (which was her official and formal profession), but as a fruit merchant. She acquired a house with eight apartments, renting out apartments to noblemen employed at the royal court. She left her business to her niece and foster daughter Charlotta Christina Boberg.

References

1784 births
1839 deaths
19th-century Swedish businesspeople
19th-century Swedish businesswomen